The China Railways SL6 (勝利6, Shènglì, "victory") class steam locomotive was a class of 4-6-2 superheated two-cylinder passenger steam locomotives operated by the China Railway. Originally built for the South Manchuria Railway (Mantetsu), the Manchukuo National Railway, the Central China Railway and the North China Transportation Company by several Japanese manufacturers between 1934 and 1940, they were the most numerous class of steam passenger locomotive in China, with 422 eventually built.

History

The "National Large Pashi", also called the "Duntu Pashi" (敦圖パシ), were ordered in 1933 for use on the newly opened Jingtu Line between Xinjing (Changchun) and Tumen and connecting to Hoeryeong in Korea. A total of nineteen, classified "Pashi" (パシ) class, were built by Kawasaki, Kisha Seizō and Hitachi, fourteen for use on both express and ordinary passenger trains on the Jingtu Line, and five for use on the Haike (Keshan–Bei'an) and Taike lines (Tai'an–Keshan) at the same time. In September 1933 they were reclassified "Pashiku" (パシク) class.

The "New National Large Pashi" was a variant of the earlier subclass which omitted the feedwater heater and had a smaller tender, in order to fit some of the shorter turntables in use by the Manchukuo National. A total of 125 units were built by Kawasaki, Hitachi, and Nippon Sharyō between 1937 and 1944.

Needing to make up for the shortage of locomotives for ordinary passenger trains after the transfer of Pashii and Pashisa class locomotives to the Manchukuo National Railway, Mantetsu ordered fourteen locomotives similar to the Manchukuo National's "National Large Pashi" (國大パシ), also known as "Duntu Pashi" (敦圖パシ). The first twelve, designated Pashiro class, were built by Hitachi in 1934. Another eight came from Hitachi, Kawasaki and Mantetsu's Shahekou Works in 1936–1938, followed by 25 more from Kawasaki between 1940 and 1943. These engines were an intermediate stage between the Pashishi and Pashiko classes. The Pashiko class had been the first Mantetsu class equipped with a combustion chamber firebox; the Pashiro class included this feature, and also was the first class of Mantetsu steam locomotives fitted with a feedwater heater. They also had the largest tenders of any Mantetsu steam locomotive.

Both the Mantetsu Pashiro class and the Manchukuo National Pashiku class locomotives were used for hauling the Asia Express between Xinjing and Harbin after the track was upgraded. They were also used on the "Kōa" and "Tairiku" limited express trains that travelled between Beijing and Busan, Korea, as well as for other regular express and ordinary passenger trains. 

With the introduction of the unified classification system of 1938, the Mantetsu Pashiro class and the Manchukuo National and North China Transport Pashiku class locomotives were grouped together under the Pashiro designation.

In 1938, twelve Manchukuo National Pashiku class engines (numbers 566–569 and 571–578, all of the "New Large" type) were transferred to North China Transport, and in 1941 North China Transport ordered another 57 identical units from Kawasaki, numbered 1533–1589.

In 1941, eight were built by Kawasaki for the Central China Railway, which designated them KC100 class, numbered KC1001 through KC1008.

The Chosen Government Railway operated 25 that it received on loan from the Manchukuo National.

Postwar

China Railways SL6 (胜利6)

At the end of the Second Sino-Japanese War, a total of 272 Pashiro class locomotives were taken over by the Republic of China Railway - 177 from Mantetsu and the Manchukuo National, 69 from North China Transport, 8 from the Central China Railway, plus another 18 from other railways. After the establishment of the People's Republic and the creation of the current China Railway, these locomotives were designated class ㄆㄒ陸 (PX6) in 1951, and in 1959 they were renamed class SL6 (胜利, Shènglì, "victory") and  numbered 301-572. In common with many steam classes, the cabside number often didn't include the suffix, so SL6 631 would have SL631 painted on the loco.

Between 1956 and 1958, the China Railway's Sifang Locomotive Works in Qingdao built a further 151 units, numbered 601-750 and 771, passing over the numbers used by the SL7 (formerly Pashina) class locomotives. They were the mainstay of the China Railway's passenger transportation for many years, being used all over China including places as diverse as Nanning, Nanjing, Hailar and Shizuishan. However, as the weight of passenger trains increased in the 1970s and 1980s, they were progressively relegated to secondary duties. By 1990, most of the survivors were concentrated in Manchuria, at Dashiqiao, Jilin and Baicheng depots, whilst at the other end of the country, a few remained in use at Chengdu. The final three, Sifang-built engines SL6 631, 635, and 680, remained in service at Jilin until 1991.

Korean State Railway 바시유 (Pasiyu) class
Of the 25 Pashiro-class locomotives which had been loaned to the Chosen Government Railway and were still in Korea at the end of the Pacific War likely all ended up with the Korean State Railway in North Korea, as no record of them being operated in South Korea exists. In the north, they were designated 바시유 (Pasiyu) class, and were likely retired by the end of the 1960s.

Preservation 
SL6-601: is preserved at the Beijing Railway Museum.
SL6-724: was plinthed at the driver training school at Hohhot.

Class Specifications

References

Steam locomotives of China
Standard gauge locomotives of China
Rolling stock of Manchukuo
Locomotives of Korea
Locomotives of North Korea
Railway locomotives introduced in 1933
Railway locomotives introduced in 1934
Railway locomotives introduced in 1936
Railway locomotives introduced in 1956
4-6-2 locomotives
CSR Sifang Co Ltd.
Hitachi locomotives
Kawasaki locomotives
Shahekou Works locomotives
Kisha Seizo locomotives
Nippon Sharyo locomotives
Passenger locomotives